Olayiwola is a Nigerian surname. Notable people with the surname include:

Lamidi Olayiwola Adeyemi III (born 1938), traditional ruler of Oyo
Jacqueline Nwando Olayiwola, American physician, author, and professor
Porsha Olayiwola, American poet
Oluwole Olayiwola Amusan, Nigerian academic